25 Squadron may refer to:

Air Force Squadrons 
No. 25 Squadron PAF
No. 25 Squadron RAF
No. 25 Squadron RAAF
No. 25 Squadron RNZAF